Kibrit Air Base (formerly Kabrit Air Base) is an operational Egyptian Air Force helicopter base located in Egypt, approximately 20 miles north of Suez and 125 km east of Cairo. An SA-342 Gazelle unit is based here. The name of the station came from a nearby village, and in Egyptian means "sulphur". Kabrit now is the name of a pilot station for Suez canal navigation on the same location.

History
During World War II the facility was known as RAF Station Kabrit, (Landing Ground 213) and was a major Royal Air Force facility which was used during the Western Desert Campaign.  In 1941, it was where the Special Air Service (SAS) was formed.  Beginning in 1943, United States Army Air Forces Ninth Air Force units arrived to supplement the RAF against the Germans in the Western Desert.  After the war, Kabrit remained a RAF station, hosting transport squadrons, five circa 1946. This continued until the breakdown in relations between the British and Egyptian governments in 1956, when the decision was taken to pull out British forces from the Suez Canal Zone.

The airfield was taken over by the Egyptian Air Force and renamed "Kibrit", becoming one of its main airfields.  During the 1956 Suez Crisis,  it was an airfield for 20 Squadron EAF, equipped with twelve Soviet-built Mikoyan-Gurevich MiG-15 aircraft.  During the 1967 Arab-Israeli War, the station was attacked by the Israeli Air Force, and many of its Soviet-built MiG-17 aircraft were destroyed on the ramp by the IAF's Dassault Mystère IVs. In the 1973 Yom Kippur War with Israel, the airfield was captured by Israeli ground forces that crossed the Suez Canal along with Kasfreet and Shalufa Airfields, however it was not used by the Israeli Air Force.

Kibrit remains an Egyptian Air Force base. Currently, the airfield houses an SA-342 Gazelle unit. Its main runways are having their asphalt removed, but the hangars are still being used for housing the helicopters.

Operational units and aircraft

See also
 List of former Royal Air Force stations
 List of World War II North Africa Airfields

References

 Jefford, C.G. RAF Squadrons, a Comprehensive Record of the Movement and Equipment of all RAF Squadrons and their Antecedents since 1912. Shrewsbury, Shropshire, UK: Airlife Publishing, 2001. .

 Maurer, Maurer. Air Force Combat Units of World War II. Maxwell AFB, Alabama: Office of Air Force History, 1983. .
 
 Royal Air Force Airfield Creation for the Western Desert Campaign

Airfields of the United States Army Air Forces in Egypt
World War II airfields in Egypt
Defunct airports in Egypt